Hisonotus thayeri is a species of catfish in the family Loricariidae. It is native to South America, where it occurs in the basins of the Macaé River, the Tabapoana River, the Paraíba do Sul River, the Itapemirim River, the Doce River, the Novo River, the Benevente River, and Lagoa Feia in Brazil. The species reaches 4.2 cm (1.7 inches) SL and was formerly considered conspecific with Hisonotus notatus, being described as its own species in 2016.

References 

Otothyrinae
Fish described in 2016